Osakis is a city in Douglas and Todd counties in the U.S. state of Minnesota. The population was 1,771 at the 2020 census.

History
The city took its name from nearby Lake Osakis.

Geography
The ice-out records  for Lake Osakis go back to 1870; this is the longest time series of any lake in Minnesota.

The main part of Osakis is in Douglas County; only a small part of the city extends into Todd County. Osakis is situated on the southwest shore of Lake Osakis, on Minnesota State Highway 27. Osakis is approximately one mile (1.6 km) from exit 114 of Interstate 94/U.S. Highway 52.

Demographics

2010 census
As of the census of 2010, there were 1,740 people, 743 households, and 440 families living in the city. The racial makeup of the city was 98.3% White, 0.3% African American, 0.2% Native American, 0.3% Asian, 0.1% from other races, and 0.7% from two or more races. Hispanic or Latino of any race were 0.7% of the population.

There were 743 households, of which 28.4% had children under the age of 18 living with them, 45.6% were married couples living together, 10.0% had a female householder with no husband present, 3.6% had a male householder with no wife present, and 40.8% were non-families. 35.4% of all households were made up of individuals, and 19.7% had someone living alone who was 65 years of age or older. The average household size was 2.25 and the average family size was 2.90.

The median age in the city was 42.2 years. 24.5% of residents were under the age of 18; 6% were between the ages of 18 and 24; 22.7% were from 25 to 44; 21.3% were from 45 to 64; and 25.6% were 65 years of age or older. The gender makeup of the city was 47.3% male and 52.7% female.

2000 census
As of the census of 2000, there were 1,567 people, 661 households, and 405 families living in the city. The racial makeup of the city was 98.15% White, 0.13% African American, 0.38% Native American, 0.70% Asian, and 0.64% from two or more races. Hispanic or Latino of any race were 0.64% of the population.

There were 661 households, out of which 26.2% had children under the age of 18 living with them, 50.2% were married couples living together, 7.4% had a female householder with no husband present, and 38.7% were non-families. 34.8% of all households were made up of individuals, and 22.4% had someone living alone who was 65 years of age or older.  The average household size was 2.23 and the average family size was 2.84.

In the city, the population was spread out, with 22.0% under the age of 18, 6.8% from 18 to 24, 21.4% from 25 to 44, 20.2% from 45 to 64, and 29.7% who were 65 years of age or older.  The median age was 45 years. For every 100 females, there were 90.2 males.  For every 100 females age 18 and over, there were 85.0 males.

The median income for a household in the city was $29,833, and the median income for a family was $38,864. Males had a median income of $28,819 versus $20,000 for females. The per capita income for the city was $15,212.  About 5.6% of families and 9.1% of the population were below the poverty line, including 8.1% of those under age 18 and 13.7% of those age 65 or over.

Notable natives

Gar Wood, inventor of the hydraulic-lift dump truck, boat designer, boat racer, and world water speed record holder was raised in Osakis, and it was a steamboat race on Lake Osakis that got him into racing.
Tommy Gibbons and his brother Mike Gibbons, members of the International Boxing Hall of Fame, had a summer home on Osakis Lake. Tommy gave money from his last fight to build Osakis's Church of the Immaculate Conception.
Leif Enger, author of the best-selling novel Peace Like a River, was born and raised in Osakis.

References

Cities in Douglas County, Minnesota
Cities in Todd County, Minnesota
Cities in Minnesota